Bulbophyllum erythroglossum is a species of orchid in the genus Bulbophyllum. It is critically endangered due to wood collecting and possibly illegal collection. It may be extinct.

References

The Bulbophyllum-Checklist
The Internet Orchid Species Photo Encyclopedia

erythroglossum
Species endangered by the pet trade